

Events

Pre-1600
1258 – Mongol invasions: Baghdad falls to the Mongols, bringing the Islamic Golden Age to an end.
1306 – In front of the high altar of Greyfriars Church in Dumfries, Robert the Bruce murders John Comyn, sparking the revolution in the Wars of Scottish Independence.
1355 – The St Scholastica Day riot breaks out in Oxford, England, leaving 63 scholars and perhaps 30 locals dead in two days.
1502 – Vasco da Gama sets sail from Lisbon, Portugal, on his second voyage to India.
1567 – Lord Darnley, second husband of Mary, Queen of Scots, is found strangled following an explosion at the Kirk o' Field house in Edinburgh, Scotland, a suspected assassination.

1601–1900
1712 – Huilliches in Chiloé rebel against Spanish encomenderos.
1763 – French and Indian War: The Treaty of Paris ends the war and France cedes Quebec to Great Britain.
1814 – Napoleonic Wars: The Battle of Champaubert ends in French victory over the Russians and the Prussians.
1840 – Queen Victoria of the United Kingdom marries Prince Albert of Saxe-Coburg-Gotha.
1846 – First Anglo-Sikh War: Battle of Sobraon: British defeat Sikhs in the final battle of the war.
1861 – Jefferson Davis is notified by telegraph that he has been chosen as provisional President of the Confederate States of America.
1862 – American Civil War: A Union naval flotilla destroys the bulk of the Confederate Mosquito Fleet in the Battle of Elizabeth City on the Pasquotank River in North Carolina.

1901–present
1906 – , the first of a revolutionary new breed of battleships, is christened.
1920 – Józef Haller de Hallenburg performs the symbolic wedding of Poland to the sea, celebrating restitution of Polish access to open sea.
1920 – About 75% of the population in Zone I votes to join Denmark in the 1920 Schleswig plebiscites.
1923 – Texas Tech University is founded as Texas Technological College in Lubbock, Texas.
1930 – The Việt Nam Quốc Dân Đảng launches the failed Yên Bái mutiny in hope of overthrowing French protectorate over Vietnam.
1933 – In round 13 of a boxing match at New York City's Madison Square Garden, Primo Carnera knocks out Ernie Schaaf. Schaaf dies four days later.
1936 – Second Italo-Abyssinian War: Italian troops launch the Battle of Amba Aradam against Ethiopian defenders.
1939 – Spanish Civil War: The Nationalists conclude their conquest of Catalonia and seal the border with France.
1940 – The Soviet Union begins mass deportations of Polish citizens from occupied eastern Poland to Siberia.
1943 – World War II: Attempting to completely lift the Siege of Leningrad, the Soviet Red Army engages German troops and Spanish volunteers in the Battle of Krasny Bor.
1947 – The Paris Peace Treaties are signed by Italy, Romania, Hungary, Bulgaria, Finland and the Allies of World War II.
1954 – U.S. President Dwight D. Eisenhower warns against United States intervention in Vietnam.
1962 – Cold War: Captured American U2 spy-plane pilot Gary Powers is exchanged for captured Soviet spy Rudolf Abel.
1967 – The 25th Amendment to the United States Constitution is ratified.
1972 – Ras Al Khaimah joins the United Arab Emirates, now making up seven emirates.
1984 – Kenyan soldiers kill an estimated 5,000 ethnic Somali Kenyans in the Wagalla massacre.
1989 – Ron Brown is elected chairman of the Democratic National Committee, becoming the first African American to lead a major American political party.
1996 – IBM supercomputer Deep Blue defeats Garry Kasparov in chess for the first time.
2003 – France and Belgium break the NATO procedure of silent approval concerning the timing of protective measures for Turkey in case of a possible war with Iraq.
2004 – Forty-three people are killed and three are injured when a Fokker 50 crashes near Sharjah International Airport.
2009 – The communications satellites Iridium 33 and Kosmos 2251 collide in orbit, destroying both.
2013 – Thirty-six people are killed and 39 others are injured in a stampede in Allahabad, India, during the Kumbh Mela festival.
2016 – South Korea decides to stop the operation of the Kaesong joint industrial complex with North Korea in response to the launch of Kwangmyŏngsŏng-4.
2018 – Nineteen people are killed and 66 injured when a Kowloon Motor Bus double decker on route 872 in Hong Kong overturns.
2021 – The traditional Carnival in Rio de Janeiro, Brazil is canceled for the first time because of the COVID-19 pandemic.

Births

Pre-1600
1486 – George of the Palatinate, German bishop (d. 1529)
1499 – Thomas Platter, Swiss author and scholar (d. 1582)
1514 – Domenico Bollani, Bishop of Milan (d. 1579)

1601–1900
1606 – Christine of France, Duchess of Savoy (d. 1663)
1609 – John Suckling, English poet and playwright (d. 1642)
1627 – Cornelis de Bie, Flemish poet and jurist (d. 1715)
1685 – Aaron Hill, English poet and playwright (d. 1750)
1696 – Johann Melchior Molter, German violinist and composer (d. 1765)
1744 – William Cornwallis, English admiral and politician (d. 1819)
1766 – Benjamin Smith Barton, American botanist and physician (d. 1815)
1775 – Charles Lamb, English poet and essayist (d. 1834)
1785 – Claude-Louis Navier, French physicist and engineer (d. 1836)
1795 – Ary Scheffer, Dutch-French painter and academic (d. 1858)
1797 – George Chichester, 3rd Marquess of Donegall (d. 1883)
1821 – Roberto Bompiani, Italian painter and sculptor (d. 1908)
1824 – Samuel Plimsoll, English merchant and politician (d. 1898)
1842 – Agnes Mary Clerke, Irish astronomer and author (d. 1907)
1843 – Adelina Patti, Italian-French opera singer (d. 1919)
1846 – Lord Charles Beresford, Irish admiral and politician (d. 1919)
  1846   – Ira Remsen, American chemist and academic (d. 1927)
1847 – Nabinchandra Sen, Bangladeshi poet and author (d. 1909)
1859 – Alexandre Millerand, French lawyer and politician, 12th President of France (d. 1943)
1867 – Robert Garran, Australian lawyer and public servant (d. 1957)
1868 – Prince Waldemar of Prussia (d. 1879)
  1868   – William Allen White, American journalist and author (d. 1944)
1869 – Royal Cortissoz, American art critic (d. 1948)
1879 – Ernst Põdder, Estonian general (d. 1932)
1881 – Pauline Brunius, Swedish actress and director (d. 1954)
1883 – Edith Clarke, American electrical engineer (d. 1959)
  1883   – H.V. Hordern, Australian cricketer (d. 1938)
1889 – Cevdet Sunay, Turkish general and politician, 5th President of Turkey (d. 1982)
1890 – Fanny Kaplan, Ukrainian-Russian activist (d. 1918)
  1890   – Boris Pasternak, Russian poet, novelist, and literary translator Nobel Prize laureate (d. 1960)
1892 – Alan Hale Sr., American actor and director (d. 1950)
1893 – Jimmy Durante, American actor, singer, and pianist (d. 1980)
  1893   – Bill Tilden, American tennis player and coach (d. 1953)
1894 – Harold Macmillan, English captain and politician, Prime Minister of the United Kingdom (d. 1986)
1897 – Judith Anderson, Australian actress (d. 1992)
  1897   – John Franklin Enders, American virologist and academic, Nobel Prize laureate (d. 1985)
1898 – Bertolt Brecht, German director, playwright, and poet (d. 1956)
  1898   – Joseph Kessel, French journalist and author (d. 1979)

1901–present
1901 – Stella Adler, American actress and educator (d. 1992)
1902 – Walter Houser Brattain, Chinese-American physicist and academic, Nobel Prize laureate (d. 1987)
1903 – Waldemar Hoven, German physician (d. 1948)
  1903   – Matthias Sindelar, Austrian footballer and manager (d. 1939)
1904 – John Farrow, Australian-American director, producer, and screenwriter (d. 1963)
1905 – Walter A. Brown, American businessman, founded the Boston Celtics (d. 1964)
  1905   – Chick Webb, American drummer and bandleader (d. 1939)
1906 – Lon Chaney Jr., American actor (d. 1973)
1907 – Anthony Cottrell, New Zealand rugby player (d. 1988)
1908 – Jean Coulthard, Canadian composer and educator (d. 2000)
1909 – Min Thu Wun, Burmese poet, scholar, and politician (d. 2004)
1910 – Dominique Pire, Belgian friar, Nobel Prize laureate (d. 1969)
1914 – Larry Adler, American harmonica player, composer, and actor (d. 2001)
1915 – Vladimir Zeldin, Russian actor (d. 2016)
1919 – Ioannis Charalambopoulos, Greek colonel and politician, Deputy Prime Minister of Greece (d. 2014)
1920 – Alex Comfort, English physician and author (d. 2000)
  1920   – Neva Patterson, American actress (d. 2010)
  1920   – José Manuel Castañón, Spanish lawyer and author (d. 2001)
1922 – Árpád Göncz, Hungarian author, playwright, and politician, 1st President of Hungary (d. 2015) 
  1922   – José Gabriel da Costa later known as Mestre Gabriel, Brazilian spiritual leader, founder of the União do Vegetal (d. 1971)
1923 – Allie Sherman, American football player and coach (d. 2015)
1924 – Max Ferguson, Canadian radio host and actor (d. 2013)
  1924   – Bud Poile, Canadian ice hockey player and coach (d. 2005)
1925 – Pierre Mondy, French actor and director (d. 2012)
1926 – Sidney Bryan Berry, American general (d. 2013)
  1926   – Danny Blanchflower, Northern Irish soldier, footballer and manager (d. 1993)
1927 – Leontyne Price, American operatic soprano 
1929 – Jerry Goldsmith, American composer and conductor (d. 2004)
  1929   – Jim Whittaker, American mountaineer
  1929   – Lou Whittaker, American mountaineer
1930 – E. L. Konigsburg, American author and illustrator (d. 2013)
  1930   – Robert Wagner, American actor and producer
1931 – James West, American inventor and acoustician
1932 – Barrie Ingham, English-American actor (d. 2015)
1933 – Richard Schickel, American journalist, author, and critic (d. 2017)
  1933   – Faramarz Payvar, Iranian santur player and composer (d. 2009)
1935 – Theodore Antoniou, Greek composer and conductor (d. 2018)
  1935   – Barbara Maier Gustern, American vocal coach and singer (d. 2022)
1937 – Anne Anderson, Scottish physiologist and academic (d. 1983)
  1937   – Roberta Flack, American singer-songwriter and pianist 
1939 – Adrienne Clarkson, Hong Kong-Canadian journalist and politician, 26th Governor General of Canada
  1939   – Deolinda Rodríguez de Almeida, Angolan nationalist (d. 1967)
1940 – Mary Rand, English sprinter and long jumper
  1940   – Kenny Rankin, American singer-songwriter (d. 2009)
1941 – Michael Apted, English director and producer (d. 2021)
1944 – Peter Allen, Australian singer-songwriter, pianist, and actor (d. 1992)
  1944   – Frank Keating, American lawyer and politician, 25th Governor of Oklahoma
  1944   – Frances Moore Lappé, American author and activist
  1944   – Rufus Reid, American bassist and composer 
1945 – Delma S. Arrigoitia, Puerto Rican historian, author, educator and lawyer 
1947 – Louise Arbour, Canadian lawyer and jurist
  1947   – Butch Morris, American cornet player, composer, and conductor (d. 2013)
  1947   – Nicholas Owen, English journalist
1949 – Nigel Olsson, English rock drummer and singer-songwriter
1950 – Luis Donaldo Colosio Murrieta, Mexican economist and politician (d. 1994)
  1950   – Mark Spitz, American swimmer
1951 – Bob Iger, American media executive
1952 – Lee Hsien Loong, Singaporean general and politician, 3rd Prime Minister of Singapore
1955 – Jim Cramer, American television personality, pundit, and author
  1955   – Greg Norman, Australian golfer and sportscaster
1956 – James Martin Graham, American Roman Catholic priest (d. 1997)
1956 – Enele Sopoaga, Tuvaluan politician, 12th Prime Minister of Tuvalu
1957 – Katherine Freese, American astrophysicist and academic
1959 – John Calipari, American basketball player and coach
1960 – Jim Kent, American biologist, computer programmer, academic
1961 – Alexander Payne, American director, producer, and screenwriter
  1961   – George Stephanopoulos, American television journalist
1962 – Randy Velischek, Canadian ice hockey player and coach
  1962   – Cliff Burton, American heavy metal bassist (d. 1986)
  1962   – Bobby Czyz, American boxer and commentator
1963 – Lenny Dykstra, American baseball player
1964 – Glenn Beck, American journalist, producer, and author
1966 – Natalie Bennett, Australian-English journalist and politician
  1966   – Daryl Johnston, American football player and sportscaster
1967 – Laura Dern, American actress, director, and producer
  1967   – Jacky Durand, French cyclist and sportscaster
  1967   – Vince Gilligan, American director, producer, and screenwriter
1968 – Peter Popovic, Swedish ice hockey player and coach
  1968   – Garrett Reisman, American engineer and astronaut
1969 – Joe Mangrum, American painter and sculptor
  1969   – James Small, South African rugby player (d. 2019)
1970 – Melissa Doyle, Australian journalist and author
  1970   – Noureddine Naybet, Moroccan international footballer and manager
  1970   – Åsne Seierstad, Norwegian journalist and author
1971 – Lorena Rojas, Mexican actress and singer (d. 2015)
1972 – Michael Kasprowicz, Australian cricketer
1973 – Martha Lane Fox, Baroness Lane-Fox of Soho, English businesswoman and politician
1974 – Elizabeth Banks, American actress
  1974   – Ty Law, American football player
  1974   – Ivri Lider, Israeli singer
  1974   – Henry Paul, New Zealand rugby player and coach
1976 – Lance Berkman, American baseball player and coach
  1976   – Keeley Hawes, English actress
1977 – Salif Diao, Senegalese footballer
1979 – Joey Hand, American race car driver
1980 – César Izturis, Venezuelan baseball player
  1980   – Enzo Maresca, Italian footballer
  1980   – Mike Ribeiro, Canadian ice hockey player
1981 – Uzo Aduba, American actress 
  1981   – Stephanie Beatriz, American actress
  1981   – Andrew Johnson, English international footballer and club ambassador
  1981   – Holly Willoughby, English model and television host
1982 – Justin Gatlin, American sprinter
  1982   – Tarmo Neemelo, Estonian footballer
  1982   – Hamad Al-Tayyar, Kuwaiti footballer
  1982   – Iafeta Paleaaesina, New Zealand rugby league player
1983 – Vic Fuentes, American singer-songwriter and guitarist
1984 – Greg Bird, Australian rugby league player
  1984   – Alex Gordon, American baseball player
  1984   – Kim Hyo-jin, South Korean actress
  1984   – Zaza Pachulia, Georgian basketball player
1985 – Selçuk İnan, Turkish footballer
  1985   – Paul Millsap, American basketball player
1986 – Jeff Adrien, American basketball player
  1986   – Josh Akognon, American basketball player
  1986   – Radamel Falcao, Colombian footballer
  1986   – Roberto Jiménez Gago, Spanish footballer
  1986   – Viktor Troicki, Serbian tennis player
1987 – Jakub Kindl, Czech ice hockey player
  1987   – Justin Braun, American ice hockey player
  1987   – Facundo Roncaglia, Argentinian footballer
1988 – Francesco Acerbi, Italian footballer
1989 – Liam Hendriks, Australian baseball player
  1990   – Choi Soo-young, South Korean singer-songwriter, actress, and dancer
1991 – Rebecca Dempster, Scottish footballer
  1991   – Emma Roberts, American actress 
1992 – Haruka Nakagawa, Japanese singer and actress 
  1992   – Reinhold Yabo, German footballer
1993 – Max Kepler, German baseball player
  1993   – Filip Twardzik, Czech footballer
  1993   – Luis Madrigal, Mexican footballer
1994 – Kang Seul-gi, South Korean singer
  1994   – Son Na-eun, South Korean singer and actress
1995 – Carolane Soucisse, Canadian ice dancer
  1995   – Lexi Thompson, American professional golfer
1996 – Emanuel Mammana, Argentinian footballer
1997 – Lilly King, American swimmer
  1997   – Chloë Grace Moretz, American actress
  1997   – Nadia Podoroska, Argentine tennis player
2000 – María Carlé, Argentine tennis player
  2000   – Yara Shahidi, American actress and model

Deaths

Pre-1600
 547 – Scholastica, Christian nun
1127 – William IX, Duke of Aquitaine (b. 1071)
1163 – Baldwin III of Jerusalem (b. 1130)
1242 – Emperor Shijō of Japan (b. 1231)
  1242   – Saint Verdiana, Italian recluse (b. 1182)
1280 – Margaret II, Countess of Flanders (b. 1202)
1306 – John "the Red" Comyn, Scottish nobleman
1307 – Temür Khan, Emperor Chengzong of Yuan (b. 1265)
1346 – Blessed Clare of Rimini (b. 1282)
1471 – Frederick II, Margrave of Brandenburg (b. 1413)
1524 – Catherine of Saxony, Archduchess of Austria (b. 1468)
1526 – John V, Count of Oldenburg, German noble (b. 1460)
1567 – Henry Stuart, Lord Darnley, consort of Mary, Queen of Scots (b. 1545)
1576 – Wilhelm Xylander, German scholar, translator, and academic (b. 1532)

1601–1900
1660 – Judith Leyster, Dutch painter (b. 1609)
1686 – William Dugdale, English genealogist and historian (b. 1605)
1755 – Montesquieu, French lawyer and philosopher (b. 1689)
1782 – Friedrich Christoph Oetinger, German theologian and author (b. 1702)
1829 – Pope Leo XII (b. 1760)
1831 – Peter Heywood, British naval officer (b. 1772)
1837 – Alexander Pushkin, Russian poet and author (b. 1799)
1846 – Maria Aletta Hulshoff, Dutch feminist and pamphleteer (b. 1781)
1854 – José Joaquín de Herrera, Mexican politician and general (b. 1792)
1857 – David Thompson, English-Canadian surveyor and explorer (b. 1770)
1865 – Heinrich Lenz, Estonian-Italian physicist and academic (b. 1804) 
1879 – Honoré Daumier, French illustrator and painter (b. 1808)
1887 – Ellen Wood, English author (b. 1814)
1891 – Sofia Kovalevskaya, Russian-Swedish mathematician and physicist (b. 1850)

1901–present
1904 – John A. Roche, American lawyer and politician, 30th Mayor of Chicago (b. 1844)
1906 – Ezra Butler Eddy, American-Canadian businessman and politician (b. 1827)
1912 – Joseph Lister, 1st Baron Lister, English surgeon and academic (b. 1827)
1913 – Konstantinos Tsiklitiras, Greek long jumper (b. 1888)
1917 – John William Waterhouse, English soldier and painter (b. 1849)
1918 – Abdul Hamid II, Ottoman sultan (b. 1842)
  1918   – Ernesto Teodoro Moneta, Italian soldier and journalist, Nobel Prize laureate (b. 1833)
1920 – Henry Strangways, English-Australian politician, 12th Premier of South Australia (b. 1832)
1923 – Wilhelm Röntgen, German physicist and academic, Nobel Prize laureate (b. 1845)
1928 – José Sánchez del Río, Mexican martyr and saint (b. 1913)
1932 – Edgar Wallace, English author and screenwriter (b. 1875)
1939 – Pope Pius XI (b. 1857)
1944 – E. M. Antoniadi, Greek-French astronomer and chess player (b. 1870)
1945 – Anacleto Díaz, Filipino lawyer and jurist (b. 1878)
1950 – Marcel Mauss, French sociologist and anthropologist (b. 1872)
1956 – Leonora Speyer, American poet and violinist (b. 1872)
  1956   – Emmanouil Tsouderos, Greek banker and politician, 132nd Prime Minister of Greece (b. 1882)
1957 – Laura Ingalls Wilder, American author (b. 1867)
1960 – Aloysius Stepinac, Croatian cardinal (b. 1898)
1966 – Billy Rose, American composer and songwriter (b. 1899)
1967 – Dionysios Kokkinos, Greek historian and author (b. 1884)
1975 – Nikos Kavvadias, Greek sailor and poet (b. 1910)
1979 – Edvard Kardelj, Slovene general and politician, 2nd Foreign Minister of Yugoslavia (b. 1910)
1992 – Alex Haley, American soldier, journalist, and author (b. 1921)
1993 – Fred Hollows, New Zealand-Australian ophthalmologist and academic (b. 1929)
1995 – Paul Monette, American author, poet, and activist (b. 1945)
1997 – Brian Connolly, Scottish musician (b. 1945)
2000 – Jim Varney, American actor, comedian and writer (b. 1949)
2001 – Abraham Beame, American academic and politician, 104th Mayor of New York City (b. 1906)
  2001   – Buddy Tate, American saxophonist and clarinet player (b. 1913)
2002 – Dave Van Ronk, American singer-songwriter and guitarist (b. 1936)
2003 – Edgar de Evia, Mexican-American photographer (b. 1910)
  2003   – Albert J. Ruffo, American lawyer and politician, Mayor of San Jose (b. 1908)
  2003   – Ron Ziegler, American politician, 14th White House Press Secretary (b. 1939)
2005 – Arthur Miller, American actor, playwright, and author (b. 1915)
2006 – James Yancey, American record producer and rapper (b. 1974)
2008 – Roy Scheider, American actor and boxer (b. 1932)
2010 – Fred Schaus, American basketball player and coach (b. 1925)
  2010   – Charles Wilson, American lieutenant and politician (b. 1933)
2011 – Trevor Bailey, English cricketer and journalist (b. 1923)
2012 – Lloyd Morrison, New Zealand banker and businessman, founded H. R. L. Morrison & Co (b. 1957)
  2012   – Jeffrey Zaslow, American journalist and author (b. 1958)	
2013 – W. Watts Biggers, American author, screenwriter, and animator (b. 1927)	
  2013   – David Hartman, American-Israeli rabbi and philosopher, founded the Shalom Hartman Institute (b. 1931)	
2014 – Stuart Hall, Jamaican-English sociologist and theorist (b. 1932)
  2014   – Shirley Temple, American actress and diplomat (b. 1928)
2015 – Naseer Aruri, Palestinian scholar and activist (b. 1934)
  2015   – Karl Josef Becker, German cardinal and theologian (b. 1928)
  2015   – Deng Liqun, Chinese theorist and politician (b. 1915)
2016 – Fatima Surayya Bajia, Indian-Pakistani author and playwright (b. 1930)
2017 – Mike Ilitch, American businessman (b. 1929)
2019 – Carmen Argenziano, American actor (b. 1943)
  2019   – Jan-Michael Vincent, American actor (b. 1944)
2021 – Larry Flynt, American publisher (b. 1942)
2022 – Olsen Filipaina, New Zealand rugby league player (b. 1957)
2023 – AKA, South African rapper (b. 1988)

Holidays and observances
Christian feast day:
Austrebertha
Charalambos
José Sánchez del Río
Scholastica
February 10 (Eastern Orthodox liturgics)
Feast of St. Paul's Shipwreck (Malta)
Fenkil Day (Eritrea)
Kurdish Authors Union Day (Iraqi Kurdistan)
National Memorial Day of the Exiles and Foibe (Italy)

References

External links

 BBC: On This Day
 
 Historical Events on February 10

Days of the year
February